Grethe Sønck (16 July 1929 – 12 February 2010) was a Danish actress and singer.

She was born as Grethe Ingeborg Nielsen Hald in Hjerm, near Struer, but she changed her surname to Sønck in 1968. In 1946, she won a talent contest, and in 1947, she became a singer at the Restaurant Sommerlyst at Dyrehavsbakken. As a revue actress, she started in Cirkusrevyen at Dyrehavsbakken in 1962, and later came to Nykøbing Falster Revue.

Personal life
Sønck first married Hjalmar Nicolausen from 1952 until 1960, then she married Sejr Volmer-Sørensen from 1968 until his death in 1982.

Death
Grethe Sønck died on 12 February 2010 of natural causes at age 80, in her Rågeleje home.

Filmography
 The Greeneyed Elephant (1960)
 Soldaterkammerater på efterårsmanøvre (1961)
 Don Olsen kommer til byen (1964)
 Der var engang (1966)
 Naboerne (1966)
 The Olsen Gang (1968)
 Dage i min fars hus (1968)
 Midt i en jazztid (1969)
 Revykøbing kalder (1973)
 Prins Piwi (1974)
 Familien Gyldenkål sprænger banken (1976)
 Krummerne (1991)
 Roser & persille (1993)
 Olsen-bandens sidste stik (1998)
 Krummerne – Så er det jul igen (2006)

References

External links

 Biography of Grethe Sønck; accessed 20 August 2014 

1929 births
2010 deaths
Danish women singers
Danish film actresses
People from Struer Municipality